Agustín Ramon Casco (born 28 January 1997) is an Argentine professional footballer who plays as a left-back for Huracán.

Career
Casco's career began with San Lorenzo de Villa Gesell, prior to joining River Plate and subsequently Huracán. The 2018–19 Argentine Primera División campaign saw Casco appear in Huracán's first-team squad, with the defender being an unused substitute for a match with Independiente on 21 October 2018. He made his professional debut three weeks later, featuring for the last ten minutes of a win over Godoy Cruz on 12 November. After a further appearance in the Copa Libertadores versus Deportivo Lara in May 2019, Casco had a six-month loan stint in Primera B Metropolitana with Sacachispas to end the year.

Career statistics
.

References

External links

1997 births
Living people
Sportspeople from Buenos Aires Province
Argentine footballers
Association football defenders
Argentine Primera División players
Primera B Metropolitana players
Club Atlético Huracán footballers
Sacachispas Fútbol Club players